Kurhani Assembly constituency is an assembly constituency in Muzaffarpur district in the Indian state of Bihar.

Overview
As per Delimitation of Parliamentary and Assembly constituencies Order, 2008, No. 93 Kurhani Assembly constituency is composed of the following: Kurhani community development block.

Kurhani Assembly constituency is part of No. 15 Muzaffarpur (Lok Sabha constituency).

Members of Legislative Assembly 

^-bypoll

Election results

1977-2015
In the 2015 state assembly election, Kedar Prasad Gupta of BJP defeated Manoj Kumar Singh of JDU. In the 2010, October 2005 and February 2005 state assembly elections, Manoj Singh Kushwaha of JDU won the Kurhani assembly seat defeating his nearest rivals Bijendra Chaudhary of LJP, Ajay Nishad of RJD and Basawan Bhagat Kushwaha of RJD respectively. Contests in most years were multi cornered but only winners and runners up are being mentioned. Basawan Bhagat Kushwaha of RJD defeated Brajesh Kumar of BPSP in 2000. Basawan Bhagat Kushwaha of JD defeated Ashok Sharma, Independent, in 1995. Sadhu Sharan Shahi, Independent, defeated Sheonandan Rai of Congress in 1990. Sheonandan Rai of Congress defeated Sadhu Sharan Shahi of JP in 1985. Ram Praikshan Sah of Janata Party (Secular – Charan Singh) defeated Sadhu Sharan Shahi of Janata Party (JP) in 1980. Sadhu Sharan Shahi of JP defeated Hind Keshri Yadav of Congress in 1977.

2022 By Election

2020

References

External links
 

Assembly constituencies of Bihar
Politics of Muzaffarpur district